Resting by a Stream at the Edge of the Wood is an 1878 painting by Alfred Sisley, now in the Musée d'Orsay. It was given to the French state in 1906 as part of Étienne Moreau-Nélaton's collection

References

Paintings in the collection of the Musée d'Orsay
1878 paintings
Paintings by Alfred Sisley
Water in art